Marina Kuzina (born 19 July 1985 in Moscow) is a Russian basketball player who competed for the Russian National Team at the 2008 Summer Olympics, winning the bronze medal. She was also part of the 2012 Summer Olympics Russian team who missed out on a bronze medal, losing the bronze medal match 74-83 to Australia.

She was the Russian Best Young Player in 2005.

External links
 The Official Website of the Beijing 2008 Olympic Games

References

Living people
1985 births
Basketball players at the 2008 Summer Olympics
Basketball players at the 2012 Summer Olympics
Indiana Fever draft picks
Medalists at the 2008 Summer Olympics
Olympic basketball players of Russia
Olympic bronze medalists for Russia
Olympic medalists in basketball
Russian women's basketball players